Pierfrancesco Botrugno (born 25 July 1988), better known by the stage name Madman sometimes stylized as MadMan is an Italian rapper.

Biography

Early years, Escape from Heart 
Madman entered the world of hip hop by participating in the 2006 edition of Tecniche Perfette (a well-known italian freestyle competition), in Apulia, later won in Turin by July B.

In 2007 he made his debut with the self-produced mixtape Riscatto mixtape, made in collaboration with TempoXso, followed in the same year by Prequel (recorded together with Esse-P), and in 2008 by R.I.P. Street album. In 2010 Madman released the debut album Escape from Heart, released for free through the Honiro Label.

Collaborations with Gemitaiz, MM Vol. 1 
Since 2011 Madman has embarked on a musical collaboration with rapper Gemitaiz, with whom he has released the mixtape Haterproof (2011) and the EP Detto, Fatto. (2012), both released through the Honiro Label.

On June 28, 2013 Madman made the mixtape MM Vol. 1 Mixtape, consisting of 18 tracks. It was subsequently extracted from it as the only single "Come ti fa Mad", released by the label Tanta Roba of Gué Pequeno and DJ Harsh, with whom Madman signed a recording contract on September 25.

In 2014 the rapper returned to collaborate with Gemitaiz for the realization of the album Kepler, released on May 24. Anticipated by the videoclips of "Non se ne parla" and "Haterproof 2", the album met with great success in Italy, making its debut at the top of the Italian album chart and being certified gold by the Italian Music Industry Federation for over 25,000 copies sold in the country.

Doppelganger and MM Vol. 2 
In July 30, 2015, through his Facebook page, the rapper announced the completion of the second studio album Doppelganger, released on September 11 for Tanta Roba with Universal Music Group distributio.

On 27 October 2016 the mixtape MM Vol.2 Mixtape was released for free download, consisting of 16 tracks and anticipated by the videoclip of Bolla papale freestyle.

Back Home and MM Vol. 3 
On February 2, 2018 Madman releases his third studio album Back Home, anticipated by the singles "Trapano" and "Centro" (with the collaboration of the singer Coez). He also collaborates with rapper Nitro on the track called "O.K. Corral", from the album No Comment, and with rapper Enigma in the track "Che roba è?!", contained in the album Shardana.

A year later the mixtape MM Vol.3 Mixtape was released for digital download, promoted by the singles "7/8 Sour" and "Supernova".

Scatola nera 
In 2019 Madman returned to collaborate with Gemitaiz for the creation of a new part of the Veleno series, materializing on June 7 with the release of Veleno 7. The single achieved great success, debuting at the top of the Top Singles Billboard and beating the record of daily audience on Spotify Italy.

The song also played the role of the lead single on an album by the duo, entitled Scatola nera and released on September 20 of the same year.

Discography

Albums
Solo

with Gemitaiz

Mixtapes and EPs
Solo

with Gemitaiz

Others
2007: Riscatto mixtape (with TempoXso)
2007: Prequel (with Esse-P)
2008: R.I.P.

Singles

Songs featured in

Other charting songs

External links 

 Madman on Discogs
 Madman on AllMusic

Notes 

1988 births
Living people
Italian rappers